Jim O'Keeffe (born 31 March 1941) is a former Irish Fine Gael politician who served as Minister of State from 1981 to 1982 and again from 982 to 1987. He served as a Teachta Dála (TD) for the Cork South-West constituency from 1977 to 2011.

O'Keeffe was born in Skibbereen, County Cork, in 1941. He was educated at St. Fachtna's High School, Skibbereen; University College Cork; University College Dublin and the Incorporated Law School of the Incorporated Law Society. He practised as a solicitor before entering public office. O'Keeffe was first elected to Dáil Éireann at the 1977 general election as a Fine Gael TD for Cork South-West and retained his seat at each general election until his retirement in 2011.

In June 1981, he was appointed as Minister of State at the Department of Foreign Affairs with responsibility for overseas development by the Fine Gael–Labour Party government led by Garret FitzGerald. This government lasted until March 1982. After a brief period in opposition, the two parties formed a new coalition government in December 1982. O'Keeffe was appointed to the same position. In a reshuffle in February 1986, he was moved and appointed as Minister of State at the Department of the Public Service. He retained this position until March 1987, when Fine Gael returned to opposition.

He held numerous Opposition Front Bench portfolios including Foreign Affairs; Social, Community and Family Affairs; Social Welfare; Agriculture and Health; and Justice, Equality and Law Reform. In 1996–97, he was the first chair of the All-Party Oireachtas Committee on the Constitution. He is a former vice-chairperson of the Joint Oireachtas Committee on the Constitution.

O'Keeffe retired from politics at the 2011 general election.

He was a member of the Standards in Public Office Commission from 11 February 2014 until 10 February 2020.

References

 

1941 births
Living people
Fine Gael TDs
Members of the 21st Dáil
Members of the 22nd Dáil
Members of the 23rd Dáil
Members of the 24th Dáil
Members of the 25th Dáil
Members of the 26th Dáil
Members of the 27th Dáil
Members of the 28th Dáil
Members of the 29th Dáil
Members of the 30th Dáil
Politicians from County Cork
Alumni of University College Cork
Alumni of University College Dublin
Irish solicitors
Ministers of State of the 24th Dáil
Ministers of State of the 22nd Dáil
People from Skibbereen